Kasper Hakunti (born November 17, 1988) is a Finnish curler. Hakunti competed at the 2015 Ford World Men's Curling Championship in Halifax, Nova Scotia, Canada, as vice-skip for the Finnish national curling team. Hakunti previously curled with Markku Uusipaavalniemi from 2009–11, and was the fourth for the Finnish team at the 2010 World Junior Curling Championships in Flims, Switzerland leading them to a 7th-place finish.

Personal life
Hakunti is single, and currently works as a TV and radio campaign manager.

References

External links
 

1988 births
Living people
Finnish male curlers
Sportspeople from Helsinki
21st-century Finnish people